Ellipta is part of GlaxoSmithKline's trade names of several inhalable asthma and chronic obstructive airway disease (COPD) combination medications that make use of the same type of inhaler:

 Fluticasone furoate (Arnuity Ellipta, Relvar Ellipta)
 Fluticasone furoate/vilanterol (Breo Ellipta, Relvar Ellipta)
 Fluticasone furoate/umeclidinium bromide/vilanterol (Trelegy Ellipta)
 Umeclidinium bromide (Incruse Ellipta)
 Umeclidinium bromide/vilanterol (Anoro Ellipta)

Further reading